Belevi is a town in Selçuk district of  İzmir Province, Turkey. At  it is situated between Turkish state highway  and Turkish Motor way . Lake Belevi is to the east. The population of Belevi  is 2174 as of 2011. Belevi is the home of Belevi Mausoleum which was built by Lysimachus during the Hellenistic period of Anatolia. Keçi kalesi or Kızılhisar is a castle situated in the Alamandağ (Galesion), a hill to the south of Belevi. In 1991 Belevi was declared a seat of township. Town economy depends on gardening, animal breeding and some light industries such as olive press. Citrus, figs and peaches are the main crops.

References

Populated places in İzmir Province
Towns in Turkey
Selçuk District